Andrew Richard Whittall (born 19 March 1973) is a former Zimbabwean international cricketer who played in 10 Test matches and 63 One Day Internationals between 1996 and 2000. He made his Test and ODI debuts in September 1996.

Domestic career
Whittall was educated at Falcon College. He graduated from Trinity College, Cambridge with a degree in engineering and also earned four blues playing for the University cricket side. He is currently a housemaster at Ferox Hall at Tonbridge School, where he also teaches maths and coaches the 1st XI cricket team.

References

External links

Zimbabwean cricketers
1973 births
Living people
Zimbabwe Test cricketers
Zimbabwe One Day International cricketers
Cricketers at the 1999 Cricket World Cup
Cambridge University cricketers
British Universities cricketers
Manicaland cricketers
Matabeleland cricketers
Commonwealth Games competitors for Zimbabwe
Cricketers at the 1998 Commonwealth Games
Cricketers from Mutare
White Zimbabwean sportspeople
White Rhodesian people
Alumni of Falcon College
Alumni of Trinity College, Cambridge